Karl Friedrich Gentner (23 May 1876  – 13 September 1922) was a German operatic tenor.

Life 
Gentner was born in Frankenthal as the son of the mechanic Karl Gentner (1845-1900) and his wife Luise née Messinger (1851-1930) in Frankenthal, then a Bavarian Rhine District. In 1899, the father had applied for a technical patent in the USA for a simple but efficient ground anchoring system for electric poles.

Gentner became a well-known opera singer. In 1905 he married the soprano Else Fischer (1883-1943), who was later known as Else Gentner-Fischer, one of the most important dramatic soprano in Germany.

In 1906 the Frankfurt director  appointed the singer couple to the Oper Frankfurt. While his wife remained employed there throughout her life, Gentner moved to the Deutsche Oper Berlin-Charlottenburg in 1914, where he was engaged until his death.

After his death in Berlin at age 46, the singer's body was transferred to his birthplace and buried there in the family's grave. The grave still exists today (as of 2012) at the main cemetery Frankenthal. His wife later married the baritone Benno Ziegler

At the premiere of Franz Schreker's opera Der ferne Klang, 1912 in Frankfurt, Gentner played and sang the leading role of Fritz.(Friedrich C. Heller (edit.): (Publications of the Institute for Austrian Music Documentation. Volume 1). Schneider, Tutzing 1974, .</ref> The Austrian composer Alexander von Zemlinsky described Gentner as "a great talent".

Further reading 
 Walter Knögel: Karl Gentner, der bedeutende, aus Frankenthal stammende Operntenor. In Frankenthal einst und jetzt, 1963, .

External links 

 Photos of Karl Gentner in the Universitätsbibliothek Frankfurt

References 

German operatic tenors
20th-century opera singers
1876 births
1922 deaths
People from Frankenthal